Statistics of the Turkish First Football League for the 1977–78 season.

Overview
It was contested by 16 teams, and Fenerbahçe S.K. won the championship. Ankaragücü and Mersin İdman Yurdu relegated to Second League. Turkish Cup winners Trabzonspor could not play in 1978–79 European Cup Winners' Cup because they were suspended.

League table

Results

References
Turkey - List of final tables (RSSSF)

Süper Lig seasons
1977–78 in Turkish football
Turkey